Mitchell Clarke (5 January 1901 – 9 July 1988) was a Barbadian cricketer. He played in one first-class match for the Barbados cricket team in 1928/29.

See also
 List of Barbadian representative cricketers

References

External links
 

1901 births
1988 deaths
Barbadian cricketers
Barbados cricketers
People from Saint Michael, Barbados